The handball tournaments at the 2016 Summer Olympics in Rio de Janeiro was held from 6 to 21 August at the Future Arena in the Barra Olympic Park. The tournaments were won by Denmark in the men's competition and Russia for the women's tournament. The French teams for both competitions finished with the silver medal, and the bronze went to Germany and Norway, respectively.

Format
The handball event at the 2016 Summer Olympics was played between 6 and 21 August 2016 at the Future Arena in the Barra Olympic Park in Rio de Janeiro, Brazil. The Games consisted of two tournaments, one each for men and women's teams. The events featured twelve teams, who qualified for the tournament from a series of preceding tournaments, as well as the host country Brazil. The draw for the championships took place on 29 April 2016, and split the teams into round robin groups of six. Four teams from each group qualified for the knockout rounds, and the winner and runner-up receiving gold and silver medals respectively. A third-placed play-off was contested for the bronze medal.

Matches were played over 60 minutes, with two points being awarded to winners and a single point to draws in the group stage. Teams tied for points in the group stage featured a series of tiebreaker criteria including head-to-head points, goal difference and goals scored.

Competition schedule

Qualification
Qualification for the Olympics were awarded based on a series of tournaments before the event between January 2015 and April 2016. Each National Olympic Committee were allowed to enter one team each for men and women. The host country was guaranteed an entry in each event, as was the winner of the 2015 World Men's Handball Championship. Four more spots were awarded to the winners of continental qualification tournaments for Europe, Africa, Asia, and the Americas. Finally, six places were awarded through three Olympic qualification tournaments. These tournaments were open to the top six teams from the World Championship that had not already qualified as well as six entrants determined through a complex continental qualification algorithm. The twelve teams were divided into three round-robin tournaments featuring four teams, with the top two teams in each tournament qualifying.

Men's qualification

Women's qualification

Summary

Men's competition
The semi-finals saw France defeat Germany by a single point, after having a three point lead at half time. The other semi-final between Poland and Denmark went to extra-time, with the scores tied at 25-25 where Denmark won the match 29-28. The bronze medal match was held between Poland and Germany. The Polish side started hotly and had a 8-5 lead, before the Germans came back and held a 17-13 lead at half-time. Germany pushed the lead to seven points after the third quarter, and eventually won the match 31-25 to win the bronze medal.

The Danish side met the French team in the final. Leading at 16-14 after the first half, Denmark retained their lead to win the match 28-26. This was Denmark's first medal in the handball event at the Olympics, having reached their best, a fourth place in 1984. Danish player Jannick Green "dreamt about one day making" the final, and the team "worked really hard and played well". The result put an end to the French period of dominance at the Olympics, having won the two prior events in 2008 and 2012. French player Luka Karabatic commented "When you’ve got a medal around your neck it’s a little bit different and you can see what you achieved as a team... Getting a silver medal is something unbelievable."

Results

Men's competition

The competition consisted of two stages; a group stage followed by a knockout stage.

Group stage
The teams were divided into two groups of six nations, playing every team in their group once. Two points were awarded for a victory, one for a draw. The top four teams per group qualified for the quarter-finals.

Group A

Group B

Knockout stage

Women's competition

The competition consisted of two stages; a group stage followed by a knockout stage.

Group stage
The teams were divided into two groups of six nations, playing every team in their group once. Two points were awarded for a victory, one for a draw. The top four teams per group qualified for the quarter-finals.

Group A

Group B

Knockout stage

Medal summary

Medalists
Below is a full list of players awarded medals at the championships.

References

External links

 
 
 International Handball Federation
 Results Book – Handball

 
2016
2016 Summer Olympics events
2016 in handball
Olympic